Antrona may refer to:

 Antrona Schieranco, comune in the Province of Verbano-Cusio-Ossola in the Italian region Piedmont
 Alta Valle Antrona Natural Park, nature reserve in Piedmont, in Italy